The show Loose Lips was a popular daytime lifestyle and chat show broadcast on the UK channel Living TV.

The show ran for some 40 episodes in 2003, and was presented by Richard Arnold and Melinda Messenger and occasionally featured the beautiful Emma Bunton look-alike, Kerry Hartley, in the gardening segment.

The show also had a controversial spin-off psychic version called 'Psychic Live' which featured Derek Acorah.

External links

2003 British television series debuts
2003 British television series endings
2000s British television talk shows
British television talk shows
Sky Living original programming
English-language television shows